This is a list of airlines by foundation date, founded before December 31, 1930.

The date of the first airline service may differ from the foundation date. Bold names and a light-green background indicate that the airline is still in operation.

For airlines founded after 1930 see :Category: Airlines by year of establishment

Notes

References

Foundation